Mark Michael Holden (born June 12, 1957) is an American retired professional ice hockey goaltender who played eight games in the National Hockey League between 1981 and 1985: four games in the National Hockey League for the Montreal Canadiens and four games for the Winnipeg Jets.

Career 
Selected by the Canadiens in the 1977 NHL Amateur Draft, Holden spent four years at Brown University before turning pro in 1980. For the next four seasons he mainly played for the Canadiens' American Hockey League affiliate, making his NHL debut on January 23, 1982 against the Calgary Flames. In October 1984 Holden was traded to the Jets in exchange for Doug Soetaert. He would play four games for the Jets and spent the majority of the next two seasons in the minor leagues, retiring in 1986.

Career statistics

Regular season and playoffs

Awards and honors

References

External links
 

1957 births
Living people
AHCA Division I men's ice hockey All-Americans
American men's ice hockey goaltenders
Brown Bears men's ice hockey players
Fort Wayne Komets players
Ice hockey players from Massachusetts
Montreal Canadiens draft picks
Montreal Canadiens players
Nova Scotia Oilers players
Nova Scotia Voyageurs players
Sherbrooke Canadiens players
Sportspeople from Weymouth, Massachusetts
Winnipeg Jets (1979–1996) players